Kung chae nampla is a Thai salad made from fresh raw shrimp soaked in Thai fish sauce and served with chunks of gourd, cloves of garlic, chilies, and spicy sauce. Generally, Thais usually use whiteleg shrimp in this dish.

Origin
The origin of kung chae nampla is not clear but it believes that it has been a dish since in early Rattanakosin era (about 1782 – 1851) and it was originally found widespread in Thailand. It has become popular as an appetizer.

Controversial issue
Many people are afraid of sickness because raw shrimps that are used in this menu are risky of having Vibrio parahaemolyticus bacteria. It can cause  abdominal pain and diarrhea to ones who eat it (Germs from shrimp in fish sauce, 2014).

Types
There are different types of kung chae nampla. First of all, the original one, is served with chunks of gourd, cloves of garlic, and chilies with a spicy sauce that is served separately. Second, another version is served with lemongrass added. Lastly, there is the pour over version, which is served with the spicy sauce poured over the shrimp whereas other versions keep the spicy sauce separate when serving.

Related dishes

Similarly, there is also another spicy shrimp salad. However, it has boiled shrimp, lime juice, kaffir lime leaves and lemon grass as the main ingredients.

See also

 List of salads
 List of shrimp dishes

References

Shrimp in fish sauce (October, 2016). Retrieved from  
http://www.thai-thaifood.com/th/%E0%B8%81%E0%B8%B8%E0%B9%89%E0%B8%87%E0%B9%81%E0%B8%8A%E0%B9%88%E0%B8%99%E0%B9%89%E0%B8%B3%E0%B8%9B%E0%B8%A5%E0%B8%B2//  
Germs from shrimp in fish sauce (October 2014). Retrieved from 
https://www.thairath.co.th/content/663451

Thai cuisine
Shrimp dishes
Raw fish salads